{{DISPLAYTITLE:C2H5NO3}}
The molecular formula C2H5NO3 (molar mass: 91.07 g/mol, exact mass: 91.0269 u) may refer to:

 Aminooxyacetic acid (AOA or AOAA)
 Ethyl nitrate